Elio Bartolini (1922, Conegliano, Veneto, Italy, - 30 April 2006, Santa Marizza di Varmo, Friuli-Venezia Giulia, Italy) was an Italian writer, screenwriter and poet. He was a co-author of screenplays of Michelangelo Antonioni's Il grido (1957), L'Avventura (1960) and L'Eclisse (1962). In 1975 he directed his only film, L'altro dio.

References

External links
 
 Elio Bartolini
 Elio Bartolini

1922 births
2006 deaths
20th-century Italian screenwriters
Italian male poets
20th-century Italian poets
20th-century Italian male writers
Italian male screenwriters